The 1910 UCI Track Cycling World Championships were the World Championship for track cycling. They took place in Brussels, Belgium from 17 to 25 July 1910. Four events for men were contested, two for professionals and two for amateurs.

Medal summary

Events

Amateur sprint
In the heats of the amateur sprint, the Dutch Dorus Nijland would have won his heat of Frenchman Paul Texier (who later won the bronze medal) by more than 20 centimeters, but the neutral official named Texier as the winner.

Medal table

References

Track cycling
UCI Track Cycling World Championships by year
International cycle races hosted by Belgium
Sports competitions in Brussels
1910 in track cycling
July 1910 sports events
1910s in Brussels